Ceryx aethalodes is a moth of the subfamily Arctiinae. It was described by Wileman and West in 1928. It is found on the Philippines (Luzon).

References

Ceryx (moth)
Moths described in 1928
Moths of the Philippines